Francisco Reis Ferreira (born 26 March 1997), commonly known as Ferro, is a Portuguese professional footballer who plays as a centre-back for Supersport HNL club Hajduk Split.

Formed at Benfica, he made over 60 appearances for the club, winning the Primeira Liga in 2018–19. He was loaned to Valencia, Hajduk Split and Vitesse, winning the Croatian Football Cup with the second in 2022.

Ferro earned 51 caps for Portugal at youth level, and was called up for the senior team in 2019.

Club career
Born in Oliveira de Azeméis, Ferro started his football career at local club Oliveirense in 2005, where he remained until 2008. He then played for CB Estarreja and AD Taboeira before joining Benfica's youth system in 2011. Following his progress to the club's reserve team, he made his professional debut in a 2–1 away win over Oliveirense in LigaPro on 30 January 2016.

Ferro was promoted to Benfica's first team on 1 February 2019, alongside three other reserve team players, and six days later, he debuted with the Lisbon side as a 38th-minute substitute, replacing Jardel in a 2–1 home win over Sporting CP in the first leg of the Taça de Portugal semi-finals. In his first appearance as a starter, he scored his first goal for Benfica, the sixth in a 10–0 home thrashing of Nacional in Primeira Liga on 10 February.

Four days later, Ferro made his European debut as Benfica beat Galatasaray 2–1 in the first leg of the UEFA Europa League round of 32, their first ever victory in Turkey. He scored his first UEFA goal on 14 March, the second in a 3–0 (a.e.t.) win over Dinamo Zagreb in the round of 16's second leg.

On 17 October 2019, Ferro extended his Benfica contract until 2024.

On 31 January 2021, Spanish club Valencia announced the signing of Ferro on loan for the remainder of the 2020–21 season. He made three La Liga appearances, beginning on 14 February with a 2–0 loss at Real Madrid.

Unused by Benfica in the league, Ferro was loaned to Hajduk Split of the Croatian Football League on 31 January 2022. On his debut for the eventual runners-up five days later, he scored in the third minute of a 4–0 win at Gorica; he equalised in the Dalmatian club's 3–1 win over Rijeka in the cup final on 26 May.

On 14 July 2022, Ferro joined Vitesse in the Netherlands on a season-long loan, with an option to buy.

After just half year with Vitesse, he rejoined Hajduk Split, but this time on permanent transfer for the fee around 500,000 €.

International career
Ferro earned 51 caps for Portugal at youth level, starting with a 2–0 under-17 win over Bosnia and Herzegovina on 8 October 2013, in qualification for the following May's UEFA European Championship. He was called up for the finals in Malta, where the team were eliminated 2–0 in the semi-finals by eventual champions England. On 3 June 2015, he scored the first of his three international goals at the end of a 2–0 under-18 win over Norway in Mafra.

On 10 November 2015, Ferro scored the only goal as the under-19 team defeated Moldova in Nelas in a qualifier for the European Championship. He played the following July in the finals in Germany, where the side were eliminated by France in the last four. He also went with the under-20 team to the 2017 FIFA World Cup in South Korea.

In early September 2019, Ferro was called up for the first time to the Portugal national team for the UEFA Euro 2020 qualifiers against Serbia and Lithuania, replacing injured Pepe.

Career statistics

Club

Honours
Benfica
 Primeira Liga: 2018–19
 Supertaça Cândido de Oliveira: 2019

Hajduk Split
 Croatian Cup: 2021–22

Individual
UEFA European Under-17 Championship Team of the Tournament: 2014

References

External links

Liga Portugal profile

1997 births
Living people
People from Oliveira de Azeméis
Sportspeople from Aveiro District
Portuguese footballers
Association football defenders
U.D. Oliveirense players
Casa Pia A.C. players
S.L. Benfica B players
S.L. Benfica footballers
Valencia CF players
HNK Hajduk Split players
SBV Vitesse players
Liga Portugal 2 players
Primeira Liga players
La Liga players
Croatian Football League players
Eredivisie players
Portugal youth international footballers
Portugal under-21 international footballers
Portuguese expatriate footballers
Portuguese expatriate sportspeople in Spain
Expatriate footballers in Spain
Portuguese expatriate sportspeople in Croatia
Expatriate footballers in Croatia
Portuguese expatriate sportspeople in the Netherlands
Expatriate footballers in the Netherlands